The Ardea shooting was a mass shooting incident that occurred on 13 June 2021, in Colle Romito, Ardea, Lazio, Italy.

Shooting
On the morning of 13 June 2021, at about 11:00 am (GMT+2), a man opened fire at a local park located on Via Corona Boreale in Ardea. He targeted random civilians who were passing through the area. A total of three people were shot, all of whom died: an elderly man on a bicycle who was killed at the scene, and two children who died after being admitted to a hospital. A fourth person was also targeted but escaped unharmed. The attacker fled the scene and barricaded himself at his home before committing suicide.

The attacker was identified as 35-year-old Andrea Pignani, a local resident. Pignani suffered from mental health problems, and was known for previous crimes and threats, including one where he threatened his mother with a knife. The gun used in the shooting was owned by his father, a former security guard, who died months prior to the incident. All the victims were targeted at random and had no connection to the attacker.

In Italy, mass shootings in which random people are targeted are rare, making this shooting one of the deadliest in the country.

References

2021 mass shootings in Europe
2020s in Rome
2021 murders in Italy
21st century in Lazio
Deaths by firearm in Italy
June 2021 crimes in Europe
June 2021 events in Italy
Mass shootings in Italy
Metropolitan City of Rome Capital
Murder in Lazio
Murder–suicides in Italy